Anthony Robert Elliott (born 30 November 1969) is an English former professional footballer who made 186 appearances in the Football League, playing as a goalkeeper for Hereford United, Huddersfield Town, Carlisle United, Cardiff City and Scarborough. In 2010, he joined Darlington as goalkeeping coach, and has since followed Tommy Cassidy, to whom he was assistant at Workington and Blue Star, to Whitby Town.
 
Since retiring as a player, Elliott has opened a goalkeeping school in the Cumbria area, and has worked with (among others) Carlisle United, Carlisle City, the Liverpool F.C. Academy and the England national futsal team goalkeepers. He has also been assistant manager of Workington of the Conference North and Newcastle Blue Star of the Northern Premier League Division One North.

In August 2010 he joined Darlington of the Conference National as goalkeeping coach.

He is currently Assistant Head Coach at Birmingham City Women, having taken the role in July 2021 when the since-departed Scott Booth was appointed as Head Coach.

References

External links
 

1969 births
Living people
Sportspeople from Nuneaton
English footballers
Association football goalkeepers
Birmingham City F.C. players
Hereford United F.C. players
Huddersfield Town A.F.C. players
Carlisle United F.C. players
Cardiff City F.C. players
Scarborough F.C. players
English Football League players
Darlington F.C.
Women's Super League managers